Min Hla Nyet was the chief queen consort of King Minye Kyawswa I of Ava from 1439 to  1442. The couple had one daughter, Min Mya Hnit.

Ancestry
The following is her ancestry as given in the Hmannan Yazawin chronicle. Hla Nyet and her husband were double first cousins.

References

Bibliography
 

Chief queens consort of Ava
15th-century Burmese women